Centralia High School is a public high school located in Centralia, Illinois, United States.  The mascot of the school's athletic teams is the Orphans (boys) and the Annies (girls).

References

External links
 centraliahs.org

Centralia, Illinois
Educational institutions in the United States with year of establishment missing
Public high schools in Illinois
Schools in Marion County, Illinois